Thames Tower is an office building in Reading, UK.

History 

Thames Tower was completed in 1974. In September 2010, it was vacated. In June 2012, LaSalle Investment Management announced plans to demolish Thames Tower and replace it with a new 25-storey building which would be completed in 2015. However, in 2013 LaSelle Investment Management announced that it would instead refurbish the building as it was no longer confident that it could fill the new building while charging sufficient rent to fund its construction.

In January 2014, the building was purchased by Brockton Capital and Landid Property. The refurbished building opened in May 2016.

In August 2018, the building was purchased by Spelthorne Borough Council.

References 

Office buildings in England
Buildings and structures in Reading, Berkshire
Office buildings completed in 1974